Alexander M. Nicholson was an American scientist, most notable for inventing the first crystal oscillator, using a piece of Rochelle salt in 1917 while working at Bell Telephone Laboratories. He then filed a patent the next year. His priority was later disputed by Walter Guyton Cady who invented the first quartz crystal oscillator in 1921.

References

American inventors
Year of birth missing
Year of death missing